TravelPerk is a travel management company that provides business travel solutions to companies. It offers a variety of travel and expense management services in one unified platform, including automating spending limits and travel policies among others. The company is headquartered in Barcelona, with business hubs in London, Birmingham, Edinburgh, Berlin, Chicago, Boston, and Miami. The company raised $409 million at the end of its Series D funding round in 2022, achieving unicorn status and a valuation of over $1 billion.

History
TravelPerk was founded in 2015 by Avi Meir (founder of Hotel Ninjas, acquired by Booking.com), Javier Suarez, and Ron Levin.  Their aim was to create an all-in-one platform that’s aimed at making business travel management easier and keeping travelers happy.
 
Shortly after being founded, TravelPerk received a $7 million series A round led by Spark Capital. In October 2018, the company raised a $21 million Series B round led by Target Global, Felix Capital, Spark Capital, Sunstone, and Amplo. In July 2019, the company finalized a two-part, $104 million series C funding backed by Kinnevik, Partners of DST Global, Target Global, Felix Capital, Sunstone, and LocalGlobe. 
 
In 2020, due to constant changes in travel regulations and health/safety guidelines as a result of the pandemic, TravelPerk acquired Albatross API, a software company that developed TravelSafe API, providing real-time health and safety information to travelers. In the same year, the company also launched an online marketplace, where its customers can integrate partner products and services into their own platforms and workflows. 
 
In 2021, TravelPerk acquired NexTravel (Silicon Valley), one of the biggest business travel platforms in the US, ClickTravel (Birmingham), the leader in domestic business travel in the UK, and Susterra (London), a corporate responsibility consultancy to propel TravelPerk’s sustainable travel to the next level. In the same year, the company raised $160 million in series D funding, and in 2022, it raised an additional $115 million series D second round, unlocking unicorn status with a valuation of over $1 billion.

Partnerships & Marketplace
TravelPerk partners with a wide range of businesses (Divvy, BambooHR, Spendesk, Ramp, Pleo, and many more) that span a variety of industries (HR, expense management, event management, health and wellness, sustainability, and more).

TravelPerk Marketplace allows users to integrate partners and customers’ workflows together in one place. The Marketplace also gives companies access to partner discounts and access to TravelPerk’s APIs.

Services
TravelPerk is an all-in-one business travel platform for companies to book, manage, and report on business travel. Companies can book flights, accommodation, car rental, and rail services through desktop or the mobile application. This includes a travel management portal to monitor all travel expenses and invoices, a 24/7 customer care chat with travel support agents, group booking options, carbon offsetting solutions, and more.

FlexiPerk gives companies flexible booking options by charging a small fee for each trip. They can add FlexiPerk on top of any booking and cancel at any time (up to two hours before travel time) to receive 80% of their money back. 

TravelCare allows companies and travelers to keep up to date with the latest issues affecting global travel and view any potential travel restrictions for each destination. Companies can also track every step of an employee's business trip, to ensure their health and safety.

TravelPerk Events is a tool that helps companies to organize every part of events-based business trips, including managing attendees, booking hotels, scheduling, and choosing locations. 
 
 

TravelPerk’s VAT solution assists businesses to maximize their VAT recovery by saving up to 25% of their annual travel budget. 

The GreenPerk API allows businesses to build a sustainable travel policy, create net-zero strategies, travel more sustainably, and motivate employees to change travel behavior.

Awards
2022  Top 50 Best Large Companies to Work For  UK
2022  No. 1 in Business Services Best Large Companies to Work For  UK
2020  Top 100 Best Software Companies  No. 91 (Global)
2020  Top 100 Fastest Growing Products  Top 10 (Global)
2019  Best Self Booking Tool (Shortlisted)
2019  Winner Barcelona Open Innovation Contest
2019  SaaS 1000 Fastest Growing SaaS Companies
2019  NTT Data Open Innovation Contest
2017  3rd Place Noah Berlin Startup Competition
2017  Next Web Best Scale Up

References

Business travel